The Third Part of the Night is a 1971 Polish avant-garde psychological drama and horror film, set in Nazi-occupied Poland, directed by Andrzej Żuławski.

Plot 

The film is set during the occupation of Poland during World War II. The young man Michal witnesses German Nazi soldiers slaughter his wife, son and mother at their villa. Michal and his father avoid death by hiding in a nearby forest, from where they see the murders.

Michal decides to join the resistance but before his first meeting, the Gestapo kills his go-between and chases him through the town. He runs into an apartment of a pregnant woman and helps her give birth. The woman appears to be a doppelganger of his murdered wife. Michal, upset, talks with some nuns on a street, asking about his earlier life in the area, and after calming down he listens to a woman looking like his wife talk about existence, love and cruelty, then smiling romantically to each other. Michal wanders through the occupied city, witnessing existence and the surroundings in it become more nightmarish under occupation. He meets an acquaintance, Marian, whom he asks to get more rations from, but Marian replies that there is nobody Michal needs them for. Michal then talks about the possibility of miracles, and Marian responds by saying that he is behaving like a "wild wind". Michal tells Marian that he has been blessed with a family now. They go on talking about experimental infections with lice going on when they witness a German officer at a market kick a man and shoot him with his Luger pistol and walk away. Marian kneels at the body and asks where meaning, law and God has gone in the "void and medieval darkness" that "life has become", saying that "a cry must burst out of this country's soul".  Upset that the fascist culture of cruelty is now the rule, he humbly agrees to give Michal more rations. Michal gets a job in the typhus center's lice-feeding labs, where he is approved as a guinea pig, the job Marian briefly mentioned earlier. Registered as a patient he gets his first injection and an illegal vaccine, and he also obtains the vaccine, saying it's for his wife and child. He sees a nurse who tells him this is the best job, that the patient before him died and he can take his place. Back in the apartments where the woman with her baby live, he see nuns praying for a dying man, asking one of them if there is some meaning which he is unable to grasp.  She responds by just mentioning how the old people die of hunger and cold, but as Michal tells her he now has a better rations card and can bring them food she tells him not to and to keep it for himself. Before leaving he again asks the nun if she can't see any likeness between the woman and his wife. She says it's just Michal who sees something which isn't there and leaves. He delivers the vaccines and food to the mother. They talk about what her husband did before the war and Michal says that he too had a wife and child before, and when getting to hold the baby he becomes emotionally upset. A vision of a young boy on a toy horse in a dark corner appears when Michal leaves.

Later when in his bed, a mysterious masked man visit him and talks about deals they did before the war, gives Michal a book and tells him about a prophecy before saying he himself is fleeing to Switzerland and also that he believes he will find his son one day just as he believes that Michal must find the woman he loved again. He reveals he wears a mask because he is "afraid to look at his own face". It is revealed the man's name is Mr. Rosencranc when they say farewell. Michal reads pages that the man marked for him in the book about "a woman clothed with the sun and the moon under her feet", "a dragon appearing to devour her child", and "a war above in which Michał and his angels fight the dragon, which was cast out, and the woman was given wings so she could fly to wilderness". The mysterious man walks through a graveyard outside, takes off his mask and meets an old lady to whom he shows some documents, probably to travel. But as they leave, men from the SD or Gestapo appear and drag the old lady away while they shoot the man. Michal runs out and talks to a woman who looks like his wife. Later, talking with his father, the conversation becomes surreal as his father says he has never heard of "that man" before, and Michal says he "later only saw him once, from a window", and then a brutal roundup of people on the streets by SS and Wehrmacht is seen through a window, and a man tearing up a paper from his pocket before all are herded into trucks.  Michal runs to the woman with a baby and says he saw a "him" being taken away and she says Michal now must provide for her and the child. Michal is then again shown talking to his father who tells him "there is nothing to save, the world has vanished" and that he must "fathom the new laws that govern the decay" and adjust himself to them, and that that's why Michal has "acted correctly but cruel", to which Michal says he can redeem anything he did, "even the presence of our children in this world". At the lab he sees his wife again but when he blinks it turns out it was a random nurse. He and other patients have a heated discussion on authors like Nietzsche, Spengler, Proust and Balzac when a memory from "when all the professors was taken away" is mentioned, and Michal imagines the same nurse as his wife again.

After having delivered rations to the mother again, the toy horse appears in the dark corner but without the boy on it this time. Instead the boy appears before him at the job at the hospital, telling him "there is no you and me anymore". The same day he goes on a nightly mission for a friend and sees a man get shot. Next day, Michal sees the man who he earlier saw through the window in the roundup, now free. The free man then lies down next to the woman with a baby, crying, as she wakes up and sees him. They are shortly afterwards shot through a window by someone. Michal enters the hospital's labs and through his microscope he picks apart lice that have fed on his blood during the lice-feeding typhus experiments. After meeting with the resistance members, he is with the woman he helped with the childbirth, when the boy again appears from the darkness in the corner of the room and walks into another room where there is also a man and a woman. In the next sequence Michal and the woman whom he helped give birth are seen again, now naked in a bed, when his wife appears out of the same darkness and walks up to them. Michal says to the vision of his wife: "I have been finding you again", and she replies: "yes, in other people who aren’t us", and he lies back down next to the other woman as the wife also says: "I, who am leaving you, feel reconciled with you now". As Michal look over the bed he sees a crack in the floor and under it the corpse of an old woman in a coffin surrounded by candles lies facing up straight towards him.

Another roundup of people takes place and the nun he talked to earlier willingly enters one of the Germans' trucks of prisoners. After leaving for a planned mission, Michal is pulled away in the last second by a woman who says that it's a trap, and they watch the other resistance members dragged out from a house by the Germans, and arrested, beaten, shot, etc., on the street. Michal goes to his father's place and there sees a painting on the wall resembling the boy from the shadows. After leaving, the father sets fire to his violin notes on the floor, repeating a Latin prayer while going up in the fiery inferno. Michal goes to the hospital to end the misery of a man mistaken for him and tortured, who smiles at him. A nurse walks in and shouts in fear when seeing Michal in the room and as he runs out, chased by people, he finds himself running through a long basement corridor, and at the end he sees a stretcher with a body on. He pulls the cover off and see the dead body looks exactly like himself. He is shocked, and a shot is heard and Michal is hit in the neck and falls bloody down some stairs, sees a familiar looking woman get pushed into what looks like a lobby, then crawls backwards in terror, finding himself in a corridor with rows of Gestapo cells, with the lifeless body of a tortured prisoner in a chair in each cell, he stumbles in panic into his family villa where it all began, with the three bodies of his family next to each other on the main entrance floor. A biblical verse is heard spoken by a woman in a nearby room who is putting on make-up and when she turns, leaving the room, she looks like Michal's wife, and as she recites a verse about death, the four horsemen of the apocalypse stand outside the window.

Cast
 Małgorzata Braunek – Marta
 Leszek Teleszyński – Michał
 Michał Grudziński – Marian
 Jan Nowicki – Jan
 Marek Walczewski – Rozenkranc
 Jerzy Goliński – Michal's father 
 Anna Milewska – Sister Klara

Background
The story was inspired by the experiences of Zulawski's father Miroslaw who worked at the Weigel Institute in Nazi-occupied Lviv. Professor Weigl developed an original method of producing typhus vaccine. The method consisted of breeding lice vaccinated with typhus bacteria, and then preparing a vaccine for humans. The lice had to be fed with human blood. The institute was producing typhus vaccine for the German army, and Lviv residents were encouraged to become lice feeders. Those who participated were able to receive a certificate that gave some degree of protection during the occupation. Armia Krajowa (Polish Resistance) used it as a cover for its members.

Production

The film was shot in 1970 in Krakow but the locations were selected to resemble Lwow, by then called Lviv and situated in the Ukraine.

Release
The Third Part of the Night debuted at the 1971 Venice Film Festival, and had its Polish premiere at the Lodz Film School in 1971. It was released in Poland on January 4, 1972.

Home media
The film was released for the first time on DVD by Second Run on March 19, 2007.

Reception

Critical response
Variety said "Zulawski is certainly a man to watch when he marshals and assimilates his influences more thoroughly", and remarked: "the film may try to say a bit too much, and sometimes its allusions remain too personal. But, overall, it has a grim but incisive insight into a time of terror when any order seems illusory and man becomes almost like the lice he works with in the laboratory." Time Out London gave the film a positive review, writing, "Not an easy film to come to terms with because of its cerebral nature and its self-consciousness; [but] a haunting first feature, all the same." Indiewire commented that "rarely does a debut film represent the arrival of an artist with sensibilities so fully formed," and added: "This is no typical war movie, but rather a dreamscape of anxieties and memories, where past experience is likely to be recalled through the sort of dimly-suggested narrative ellipses."  Le Monde called it a "half-real, half-dreamed adventure, a stunning phantasm, carried by the lyricism of the violence and the anguish of the places that evoke death, running blood, penetrating fear." Ben Sachs from Chicago Reader awarded the film 4/4 stars. In his review on the film, Sachs wrote, "A sustained nightmare about societal and personal breakdown, it presents one man's descent into madness during the Nazi occupation of Poland, though the story is hard to follow (perhaps by design). Żuławski divulges important information about the characters in short, unexpected bursts, and the plot moves sinuously between the hero's present, past, and dream life. Moreover, the camera is almost always moving hurriedly around the characters, as though the director were having trouble keeping up with his own subjects. These devices can make a viewer feel lost, much as the hero feels in his own experience."

Awards

The Andrzej Munk Award for Best Debut (Poland, 1971)

Honorary Diploma (Adelaide International Film Festival, Australia, 1972)

The Grand Prize at the Koszalin Film Festival (Poland, 1973)

References

External links
 
 
 

1971 drama films
1972 horror films
1972 films
1970s avant-garde and experimental films
Polish drama films
Polish horror films
1970s Polish-language films
Films directed by Andrzej Żuławski
Films set in Poland
Polish World War II films
1971 war films
1971 horror films
1971 films
Polish avant-garde and experimental films
Films about fascists
Films about Nazis
Films about Nazism
Films about anti-fascism
Films about Catholicism
Films about philosophy
1972 drama films
Films about Polish resistance during World War II